Chifley Ministry may refer to:

 First Chifley Ministry
 Second Chifley Ministry